Big Dalton Dam is a multiple arch concrete dam in Los Angeles County, California, built for the Los Angeles County Flood Control District and completed in August 1929. The dam is one of the earliest of the multiple arch "double-wall" buttress designs of engineer Fred A. Noetzli.  The 991 acre-foot (1.2 million cubic meter) dam provides water conservation and controls flooding from Big Dalton Canyon, a watershed within the San Dimas Experimental Forest, part of the Angeles National Forest in the San Gabriel Mountains.  It is about 4 miles northeast of the city of Glendora and is operated by the Los Angeles County Department of Public Works.

See also
List of dams and reservoirs in California

References

External links
Historic American Engineering Record (HAER) documentation, filed under 2600 Big Dalton Canyon Road, Glendora, Los Angeles County, CA:

Los Angeles County Department of Public Works dams
Buttress dams
Angeles National Forest
San Gabriel Mountains
Dams completed in 1929
Historic American Engineering Record in California
1929 establishments in California